Václav Procházka (23 September 1904 – 24 April 1985) was a Czech equestrian. He competed in two events at the 1936 Summer Olympics.

References

External links
 

1904 births
1985 deaths
Czech male equestrians
Olympic equestrians of Czechoslovakia
Equestrians at the 1936 Summer Olympics
People from Fulnek
Sportspeople from the Moravian-Silesian Region